Kumudini may refer to

Kumudini boat massacre, on  15 May 1985 in a ferry. 
Kumudini College,  located in Tangail, Bangladesh
Kumudini Lakhia, Indian dancer
Kumudini Patnaik, Indian Politician

Indian feminine given names